Agnita (Transylvanian Saxon: Ongenîtlen) is a town on the Hârtibaciu river in Sibiu County, Transylvania, central Romania. It is considered the locality in the center of the country. The town administers two villages, namely Coveș and Ruja.

Demographics 

The population was 8,300 at the 2011 census, of which 94.2% were Romanians, 2.9% Hungarians, 1.5% Roma, and 1% Germans (more specifically Transylvanian Saxons).

History 

The first document mentioning it is a land sale contract signed in 1280 by one Henric from Sancta Agatha. In 1376, Louis I of Hungary granted to the village the right to hold a market. In 1466, Matthias Corvinus granted to the village the right to carry trials (jus gladi) and built a fortress to defend the Kingdom of Hungary from the Ottoman Empire.

Agnita, mentioned for the first time in a document from 1280, is a town with traditional crafts, famous for the old guilds of tanners, shoemakers, tailors, coopers and potters, with semi-rural economy.

Here is one of the oldest peasant fortification in Transylvania. Initiated in the thirteenth century, it was amplified successively came to be in the seventeenth century, three fortified enclosure with towers. The city center is a church-hall with three ships (naves with stands) and turn west (XV around the year 1409). In turn strengthened the church has undergone many transformations. The four towers of the fortified church - the shoemakers, tailors, blacksmiths and coopers - demonstrates the economic strength of these guilds, and were assigned to the defense that those portions of the wall in case of armed conflict. City Museum has a substantial collection of medieval art (Gothic chests, architecture, sculpture, ceramics, etc.).

King of Hungary, Louis of Anjou, conferred Agnita (or villa Zenthagata) since 1376, the right to hold an annual fair on 24 June (day of St. John). Subsequently, this right was extended to two other fairs. In 1466, a Hungarian king granted the town Agnita right "ius Gladiator", i.e., the right to decide and execute the death sentence. In the same year, the village was allowed to keep half of the contingent settlement of royal troops to defend their own city to the church from falling into foreign hands, since it was near the frontier into Wallachia. Until 1950, when the city was declared, there was a common Agnita fair (Marktgemeinde).

The railway was built in 1898 from Sighișoara to the terminus at Agnita railway station and further extended to Sibiu in 1910 with a station at Coveș. However, by 1965 the route was curtailed at Agnita with the closure of the line north including the section through the town. As a result, a new station was built in the west; however, in 2001 this too was closed. The line is a historic monument and there is an active movement to restore the entire line.

Administration and local politics

Town council 

The town's current local council has the following political composition, according to the results of the 2020 Romanian local elections:

Gallery

Natives 

 Ioan Gyuri Pascu, intellectual, teacher, radio presenter, comedian, actor, musician multi-instrumentalist, and producer
 Bernd Fabritius, politician

References

External links 

 
 The fortified church of Agnita, Fortified Churches Foundation
 agnetheln.ro
 primaria-agnita.ro

Towns in Romania
Populated places in Sibiu County
Localities in Transylvania